The John Kosmina Medal is a National Premier Leagues award given to the player of the match in the NPL Grand Final each year. Introduced in the first season of the NPL in 2013, the medal is named after John Kosmina, who played for the Australia national soccer team in 1976–1988.

List of winners

Multiple Winners

See also
Joe Marston Medal
Johnny Warren Medal
Mark Viduka Medal
Michael Cockerill Medal

Notes

References

National Premier Leagues
Australian soccer trophies and awards